Cristián Bustos (born 16 July 1983) is a Chilean modern pentathlete. He competed in the men's individual event at the 2008 Summer Olympics.

References

1983 births
Living people
Chilean male modern pentathletes
Olympic modern pentathletes of Chile
Modern pentathletes at the 2008 Summer Olympics
Sportspeople from Valparaíso
21st-century Chilean people